Montana Highway 141 (MT 141) is a  state highway in west-central Montana.  It begins at U.S. Route 12 (US 12) at Avon and ends at MT 200 north of Helmville.

Route description
MT 141 begins in Avon at an intersection with US 12. The highway heads to the northwest through the plains between the Garnet Range to the west and the Helena National Forest to the east.

Major intersections

References

External links

141
Transportation in Powell County, Montana